The 2017–18 season was the 1st season in the history of FC Dnipro in Ukrainian Second League and the last one before Dnipro lost professional status. Dnipro competed in Second League and in the Ukrainian Cup. During the season Dnipro was deducted of 18 points in total, which resulted in team finishing at 8th position despite decent results in the first half of the season. During the midseason Dnipro was relegated to 2018–19 Ukrainian Football Amateur League following the FIFA sanctions.

Players

Squad information

Transfers

In

Out

Pre-season and friendlies

Competitions

Overall

Last updated: 31 May 2018

Second League

Results summary

Results by round

Matches

Ukrainian Cup

Statistics

Appearances and goals

|-
! colspan=14 style=background:#dcdcdc; text-align:center| Goalkeepers

|-
! colspan=14 style=background:#dcdcdc; text-align:center| Defenders

|-
! colspan=14 style=background:#dcdcdc; text-align:center| Midfielders 

|-
! colspan=14 style=background:#dcdcdc; text-align:center| Forwards

|-
! colspan=14 style=background:#dcdcdc; text-align:center| Players transferred out during the season

Last updated: 31 May 2018

Goalscorers

Clean sheets

Disciplinary record

Last updated: 31 May 2018

References

External links 
Official website

Dnipro
FC Dnipro seasons